Nethra is an Indian Telugu language Supernatural fiction television series aired on GeminiTV from 10 October 2022 to 4 March 2023. The show stars Sudipta Benarjee and Shivani Tomar in titular role and Prem Jacob and Bharadwaj in pivotal roles.

Plot
The story of Love Vs Revenge where it’s continuing since 6 births to the present 7th birth. Nethra is a naagini who’s chosen by Mahadeva to protect and maintain the survival of humanity. For that, all the powers to preserve peace for the whole world were stored in the Naagamani for her but only can obtain the gem by marrying a normal human. The gem also only appears every 21 years at Tripura Pournami where she should be with her partner to obtain it. She chose Arjun over Asura ( Karan) which made him outraged to achieve that gem at any costs to hail the world. This is birth by birth story where Karan in every birth keeps getting in the way for Nethra and Arjun’s love and trying to obtain the Naagamani for his selfish reasons. In the present day at 7th birth, will Nethra be able to win Arjun’s love after their marriage and can they both protect the Naagamani against Karan forms the rest of the story.

Cast
Sudipta Benarjee / Shivani Tomar as Nethra, Istaroopadhari Naagini
Prem Jacob as Arjun, Nethra's husband
Bharadwaj as Karan Rayapati
Radha Krishna as Rajasekhar Rayapati, great business man and Karan's father
Jyothi Reddy as Pushpa, Karan's mother
Chinna as Narayana Rao, Nethra's Father
Durga devi as Saraswathi, Nethra's mother 
Annapurna Vitthal as Old lady who in lives Lord Siva temple
Krishnaveni as Karan's grand mother
Chakri as Karan's uncle and Krishnaveni’s husband 
Anju Asrani as Krishnaveni, Karan's aunt
Priya Tarun as Jhansi, Karan's Aunt
Akella Gopala Krishna as Jhansi’s husband 
Anuradha as Ashmitha, Karan’s cousin sister 
Sravani Yadav as Sona, Karan’s sister
Abhiram as Amar, Karan’s cousin brother
Poorna Sai Kumar as Vishwak, Karan’s cousin brother

Dubbed Versions

References

Indian television soap operas
Telugu-language television shows
2022 Indian television series debuts
Gemini TV original programming